Zoe Strimpel (born 8 July 1982) is a British journalist, author, and commentator on gender and relationships. She is a columnist for The Sunday Telegraph where she writes a weekly column, commenting on gender, feminism, dating, relationships and identity politics.

Early life and education
Strimpel studied English at Jesus College, Cambridge, and later attended Wolfson College, Cambridge. She then became a research fellow for two years on a Leverhulme Trust funded project at Sussex, Cambridge and the British Library on the business practices of feminist publishers in the 1970s.

In November 2020, she became a British Academy postdoctoral fellow at the University of Warwick, researching relational tumult following the Divorce Reform Act 1969.

Career

Author
Strimpel is the author of What the Hell is He Thinking?: All the Questions You've Ever Asked About Men Answered, which was published in July 2010.  It is aimed at providing an insight into men's thinking, researched by Strimpel interviewing men. Her second book, The Man Diet: One Woman's Quest to End Bad Romance was published on 22 December 2011. Both books received positive reviews from critics and press coverage. Strimpel is the author of an academic book, Seeking Love in Modern Britain: Gender, Dating and the Rise of 'the Single''', which charts the emergence of the dating industry in Britain in the final decades of the 20th century against the backdrop of rapidly changing gender politics, class, and sexuality.

Journalist
From 2006, Strimpel was the author of the Girl about town column in The London Paper, a now-defunct free daily newspaper. From 2008, Strimpel was a features and lifestyle writer for City AM, a business-orientated London daily newspaper. She has also written on relations between men and women for Elle, the Sunday Times Style magazine, and HuffPost. She has also contributed to The Jewish Chronicle, The Spectator, and UnHerd.

She writes a weekly column for The Sunday Telegraph.

Commentator
Strimpel has appeared on radio and television as a commentator to discuss topics such as dating, feminism, and diversity. Her piece in The Sunday Telegraph on the #MeToo movement led to appearances on the BBC and Al Jazeera to discuss the matter. She has been a regular on BBC Radio 4 A Point of View since 2020. She appeared in the HBO documentary Swiped: Hooking Up in the Digital Age'' in 2018 to discuss online dating apps. At the beginning of the 2022 Russian Invasion of Ukraine, Strimpel opined on Bari Weiss’ blog for a hawkish response of NATO.

References

Living people
Alumni of the University of Sussex
British journalists
British expatriates in the United States
English Jews
1982 births